In music and jazz improvisation, a melodic pattern (or motive) is a cell or germ serving as the basis for repetitive pattern. It is a figure that can be used with any scale. It is used primarily for solos because, when practiced enough, it can be extremely useful when improvising. "Sequence" refers to the repetition of a part at a higher or lower pitch, and melodic sequence is differentiated from harmonic sequence. One example of melodic motive and sequence are the pitches of the first line, "Send her victorious," repeated, a step lower, in the second line, "Happy and glorious," from "God Save the Queen".

"A melodic pattern is just what the name implies: a melody with some sort of fixed pattern to it." "The strong theme or motive is stated. It is repeated more or less exactly, but at a different pitch level."

See also
Color (isorhythm)
Imitation (music)
Melody type
Lick (music)
Phrase (music)

References

Further reading
Hanon, C.L. (2000) The Virtuoso Pianist. . Cited in Baerman, Noah (2003). Big Book of Jazz Piano Improvisation, p.33. .
Lateef, Yusef (1981). Repository of Scales and Melodic Patterns. Fana Music. Cited in Baerman (2003), p.33.
Slonimsky, Nicolas (2000). Thesaurus of Scales and Melodic Patterns. . Cited in Baerman (2003), p.33.

Melody
Repetition (music)